Laurent Magnier (1618–1700) was a French sculptor.

Life
He was born and died in Paris.

His son was Philippe Magnier, who was also a sculptor.

References

1618 births
1700 deaths
17th-century French sculptors
French male sculptors